The Aero Theatre is a single-screen movie theater in Santa Monica, California, built in 1939 and opened in 1940.

History
Named in tribute to the aerospace industry, the Aero Theatre was built by aviation pioneer Donald W. Douglas of the Douglas Aircraft Company, serving as a 24-hour movie house for his employees that worked at a nearby plant. The French Normandy-style theater, designed by P.M. Woolpert, cost $45,000 to build, and originally seated 678 people.

By the late 1980s, the Aero was one of Los Angeles' last repertory theaters, regularly programming double features. However, by the end of the 1990s, the theater, then owned by Chris Allen, had fallen on hard times and decreased attendance. Robert Redford, who spent time at the Aero growing up, had attempted to buy the theater for Sundance Cinemas in 2001, but the deal never came to fruition and the theater closed in April 2003.

In January 2005, the theater reopened, after renovations were made by the nonprofit organization American Cinematheque. The $1 million renovation of the Aero included the installation of a new screen (44 feet wide by 17 feet high), larger and more comfortable seats (reducing the theater's capacity to 427) and a new concession stand. The Cinematheque had previously overseen a $12.8 million renovation of Hollywood's Egyptian Theatre in 1998, and the organization schedules programming for both theaters.

The Aero underwent renovation again in 2019 and 2021, including improvements for projection, sound and general facility upgrades.

In popular culture
The Aero Theatre has made appearances in a variety of feature films throughout the years, including 10 to Midnight (1983), Masquerade (1988), Sleepwalkers (1992), Get Shorty (1995) and Donnie Darko (2001).

Alternative rock band Weezer referenced the Aero in their song "Aloo Gobi", the second track on their 2021 album OK Human. Weezer frontman Rivers Cuomo resides in Santa Monica and wrote the song in 2017 about a typical date he would go on with his wife Kyoko.

Horrorthon
Since 2006, the Aero Theatre has been home to the annual "Dusk-to-Dawn Horrorthon", a popular event held every October, featuring an all-night marathon of six to seven horror films (usually projected in 35mm), as well as free food, candy and giveaways for patrons. Grant Moninger, the festival's organizer, describes the Horrorthon as "going into some kind of absurd church of horror films." The event has spawned a number of original characters, including Corn Gorn (a variation of the Gorn creature from Star Trek), the unofficial mascot of the festival, as well as his family, friends and nemeses. Some patrons have gone so far as to vote for Corn Gorn in national elections.

In 2020, in light of the temporary closure of movie theaters due to the COVID-19 pandemic, a "home edition" of Horrorthon was offered, where patrons chose their own six-film lineups and were provided with a personalized video introduction, as well as interstitial intro videos for each film and an official Horrorthon t-shirt.

Films screened

References

Cinemas and movie theaters in California
1940 establishments in California